Phosphinoimidates, also known as phophinimides, are the anions derived from phosphine imides with the structure [R3P=N]− (R = alkyl or aryl). Phosphinimide ligands are used to for transition metal complexes that are highly active catalysts in some olefin polymerization reactions.

Synthesis of phosphinoimidate complexes
Although phosphinoimidates are formally anions, salts of the anions are typically unavailable owing to their high basicity. Instead the ligand is installed indirectly.

Staudinger reaction
Preparation of phosphinoimidate complexes are achieved in high yield from the corresponding silyl derivatives R3PNSiMe3 (Me = -CH3). These derivatives are prepared by oxidation of phosphine ligands with trimethylsilyl azide, also known as the Staudinger reaction:

PR3  +   Me3SiN3   →   Me3SiN=PR3  +  N2

Starting from these silyl compounds, a variety of phosphinoimidate complexes can be prepared. For example, reaction of dirhenium heptoxide with (N-trimethylsilyl) triphenylphosphoraneimine yields the monomeric phosphoraneiminato complex [ReO3(NPPh3)] and hexamethylsiloxane:

Re2O7  +  2 Me3SiNPPh3   →   2 [ReO3(NPPh3)]   +  O(SiMe3)2

Syntheses from nitrido complexes
The first phosphinoimidate complexes were prepared by reaction of phosphines with molybdenum and tungsten nitrido complexes:

MNCl3  +  PPh3   →   M(NPPh3)Cl3

This reaction is accompanied by reduction of the metal from +VI to +IV and phosphorus from (III) to (V). The main limitation of this reaction is the relative rarity of metal nitride complexes.

Molecular structure
Phosphinoimidate complexes of transition metals containing the [R3P=N]− ligand are known to adopt several bonding modes. In complexes with metal ions in low oxidation states (+I, +II), the [R3P=N]− group often serves as a μ3-N bridging ligand. For complexes of intermediate oxidation states (+III, +IV), the [R3P=N]− ligand bridges pairs of metals. For metals in high oxidation states (+V to +VIII), the [R3P=N]− group exists exclusively as the terminal ligand. 
Most phosphinoimidate complexes fall into two groups, one with a linear or largely linear M-N-P bridge with bond angles between 161 and 177° and another with a bent M-N-P configuration with bond angles between 130 and 140°. Linear M-N-P arrangements are achieved mainly by metals in high oxidation states while metals with lower oxidation states are characterized by bent M-N-P arrangements.

Bonding (Resonance structures)

LnM−=N+=PR3   ↔   LnM−=N—P+R3   ↔   LnM—N=PR3

Applications
One family of titanium phosphinoimidates has been commercialized as catalysts for ethylene polymerization. Cyclopentadienyl-titanium-phosphinoimidate compounds with the general formula CpTiCl2(NPR3) are effective catalysts in the presence of methyl alumoxane (MAO), while those with the general formula CpTiMe2(NPR3) are effective in the presence of trityl tetrakis(pentafluorophenyl)borate (TB).

References

Ligands